Romania–Uruguay relations are foreign relations between Romania and Uruguay. Both countries established diplomatic relations in 1935. Romania has an embassy in Montevideo. Uruguay has an embassy in Bucharest, which was re-opened in 2008.

Both countries are full members of the United Nations.

Several treaties have been undersigned between both countries: cooperation (1993), culture and science (2004) and taxing (2012)

Trade between both countries is small but stable.

See also 
 Foreign relations of Romania
 Foreign relations of Uruguay

References

 

 
Uruguay
Bilateral relations of Uruguay